The 1976 West Dorset District Council election was held on Thursday 6 May 1976 to elect councillors to West Dorset District Council in England. It took place on the same day as other district council elections in the United Kingdom. This was the second election to the district council.

The 1976 election saw the Independent councillors maintain their majority control on the Council.

Ward results

Beaminster

Bothenhampton

Bradford Abbas

Bradpole

Bridport

Broadmayne

Broadwindsor

Burton Bradstock

Caundle Vale

Cerne Valley

Charminster

Charmouth

Chesil Bank

Chickerell

Dorchester Central

Dorchester East

Dorchester West

Frome Valley

Halstock

Holnest

Loders

Lyme Regis

Maiden Newton

Netherbury

Owermoigne

Piddle Valley

Puddletown

Queen Thorne

Sherborne

Stinsford

Symondsbury

Thorncombe

Tolpuddle

Whitchurch Canonicorum

Winterborne St Martin

Yetminster

References

West Dorset
1976
20th century in Dorset